Sri Venkateswara Zoological Park is located in Tirupati, Andhra Pradesh, India.

History

The main features of the Zoo Park are:
 Mayuravani - The house for peafowl
 Mrugavani - The house for herbivores
 Vrukavihar - Living place for smaller carnivores along with parakeets, mainas, ducks, geese and a variety of other birds like flamingoes, swans, pelicans and raptors.

The leopard ate  of beef daily, the same as the other leopards in the zoo. The park's management was said to be in touch with the Guinness Book of World Records authorities seeking its entry in the records as the biggest leopard. Due to an illness and old age, it died at the age of 27 on 11 June 2013.

References

External links

 Sri Venkateswara Zoological Park Tirupati (YouTube)
 SV Zoo Park - Sri Venkateswara Zoological Park - Tirupati - A.P - Places to Visit in Tirupathi

Tirupati
Tirupati district
Zoos established in 1987
Zoos in Andhra Pradesh
1987 establishments in Andhra Pradesh
Geography of Tirupati district
Tirumala Tirupati Devasthanams
Buildings and structures in Tirupati